Dom Francisco Batistela (Cerquilho, September 30, 1931– Guaratinguetá, October 20, 2010) was the Catholic bishop of the Roman Catholic Diocese of Bom Jesus da Lapa, Brazil.

Notes

20th-century Roman Catholic bishops in Brazil
1931 births
2010 deaths
People from São Paulo (state)
Redemptorist bishops
Roman Catholic bishops of Bom Jesus da Lapa